Charles Henry Thomas Bennie (4 April 1887 – 13 January 1963) was an Australian rules footballer who played with Richmond in the Victorian Football League (VFL).

Notes

External links 

1887 births
1963 deaths
Australian rules footballers from Victoria (Australia)
Richmond Football Club players